Wewala is a village in Sri Lanka. It is located within Western Province. It is a tourist area, that suffers from some of the difficulties of that, with a notable Catholic population.

See also
List of towns in Western Province, Sri Lanka

References

External links

Populated places in Western Province, Sri Lanka